Monjur Kader Kuraishi (b. 30 June 1953) is a Bangladesh Awami League politician and the former Member of Parliament of Netrokona-3.

Early life
Monjur Kader Kuraishi was born on 30 June 1953 to a Bengali Muslim family in Netrokona, Bengal Presidency (now Bangladesh). His family claimed descent from the Quraysh, an Arab tribe which the Islamic prophet Muhammad and many of his companions belong to.

Career
Kuraishi was elected to parliament from Netrokona-3 as a Bangladesh Awami League candidate in 2008.

References

Living people
People from Netrokona District
Awami League politicians
9th Jatiya Sangsad members
1953 births
Bangladeshi people of Arab descent